Pituitary homeobox 3 is a protein that in humans is encoded by the PITX3 gene.

Function 

This gene encodes a member of the RIEG/PITX homeobox family, which is in the bicoid class of homeodomain proteins. Members of this family act as transcription factors. This protein is involved in lens formation during eye development, and the specification and terminal differentiation of mesencephalic dopamine neurons in the substantia nigra compacta that are lost in Parkinson's disease.

Clinical significance 

Mutations of this gene have been associated with anterior segment mesenchymal dysgenesis (ASMD) and congenital cataracts.

References

Further reading

External links 
 

Transcription factors